Asko Kustaa Juhani Vilkuna (17 November 1929 – 13 December 2014) was a Finnish ethnologist.

He was born in Nivala as a son of Kustaa Vilkuna. Being a lecturer in Finnish at Lund University from 1955, Asko Vilkuna took his doctorate degree in 1958. In 1961 he became docent in ethnology of Fenno-Ugric peoples at the University of Helsinki, remaining here until 1969, but also being professor of ethnology at the University of Jyväskylä from 1966 to 1993. He died in December 2014 in Jyväskylä. He was a member of the Norwegian Academy of Science and Letters from 1987.

References

1929 births
2014 deaths
Finnish ethnologists
Finnish expatriates in Sweden
Academic staff of Lund University
Academic staff of the University of Helsinki
Academic staff of the University of Jyväskylä
Members of the Norwegian Academy of Science and Letters